"Daytime Friends" is a song written by Ben Peters and recorded by American country music artist Kenny Rogers. It was released in August 1977 as the lead single from the album of the same name. The song was Rogers' second number one country hit as a solo artist.  The single stayed at number one for one week and spent a total of twelve weeks on the country chart.

The single's B-side, "We Don't Make Love Anymore," was composed by Rogers and Marianne Gordon and later covered by Anne Murray and was released on her album Let's Keep It That Way. The single's German B-Side was "Lying Again".

Content
The song is a mid-tempo, about two cheating people who are friends (and whose respective spouses are friends of one-another) during the day but have an extramarital affair at night.

Song idea
In a posting on Classic Country Songs on Facebook on October 1, 2021, Peters claimed he got the idea from watching the weather report on WSMV in Nashville (then WSM-TV) in 1975. The meteorologist, Pat Sajak (who would later host Wheel of Fortune), stated about "daytime trends and nighttime showers". This led Peters to write the song.

Charts

Weekly charts

Year-end charts

References

1977 songs
1977 singles
Kenny Rogers songs
Songs written by Ben Peters
Song recordings produced by Larry Butler (producer)
United Artists Records singles